Jukka Raitala (born 15 September 1988) is a Finnish professional footballer who plays for HJK and the Finnish national team. He usually plays as a left back in both his club side and the national team but can also operate as a right back or a central defender. Raitala was born in Kerava, Finland, where he played for the local youth team before moving to HJK's youth organization.

Club career

Early career
Raitala joined the Keravan Pallo-75 junior team at the age of seven. He played there for ten years before he moved to HJK in 2005. After just one year in the youth team he was promoted to HJK's reserve team, Klubi-04. In his lone season with Klubi-04, Raitala made 22 appearances.

HJK
In 2007, he made his first appearance for the senior side at the age of eighteen and was since then a regular in the starting eleven. His success with the Finland national under-21 football team and HJK has made him a  transfer target in Finland. For a long time Raitala refused to sign a new contract with HJK, but when the club left him out of the playing squad he chose to sign a new deal that kept him in Helsinki until the end of the 2011 season.

In 2008, SpVgg Greuther Fürth scouted him in Helsinki. In October 2008, Finnish sports magazine IS Veikkaaja reported that AEK Athens, Ajax and 1899 Hoffenheim are also scouting him. In Greek Day News, Raitala stated that he is interested in a move to AEK and that he is friends with AEK's Perparim Hetemaj.

In November, West Bromwich Albion invited him for a test period after preparative negotiations with HJK. Raitala never did the trip and stated he does not want to risk playing time by moving. He wants a guarantee for his place in the 2009 Under-21 Euros team.

In January 2009, Newcastle United invited him for a week-long trial with their first team.  It was also reported in Finnish IS Veikkaaja that Udinese Calcio and Middlesbrough F.C. are watching his progress.

In April 2009, Express.de wrote that Raitala is 1. FC Köln's top candidate to replace Pierre Womé as their left-back. On 23 April, Express.de said that Raitala is going to meet Köln and he has an exit clause in his new contract with HJK. This was later denied by the Finnish club.

On 21 April 2009, Raitala signed a new three-year deal with HJK.

In May 2009, Ajax Amsterdam, PSV Eindhoven, Bayer Leverkusen, AZ Alkmaar and Bordeaux joined the race to sign Raitala.

1899 Hoffenheim
On 31 August, HJK announced that Raitala had joined Hoffenheim on a season-long loan deal, with an option to buy him after the loan. On 15 March 2010, Raitala made his Bundesliga debut for Hoffenheim playing as a right defender against Werder Bremen. On 1 April 2010, TSG 1899 Hoffenheim signed him for four years.

On 31 August 2010, he was loaned to 2. Bundesliga side SC Paderborn 07 for one season, where he made 29 league appearances in total.

Osasuna
On 28 July 2011, he was loaned again, this time to Osasuna in Spanish La Liga, with the Spaniards having an option to buy him for €1.25 million at the end of the season. On 28 August 2011, Raitala made his La Liga debut for Osasuna playing as a left defender against Atletico Madrid. Although being a starter during the first five league matches, he has since battled for the first-choice status with local prospect Eneko Satrústegui.

SC Heerenveen
On 6 June 2012,  Raitala signed a four-year contract with a Dutch Eredivisie club, SC Heerenveen. His contract was dissolved on 2 February 2015, after he had lost prospect of play time.

FC Vestsjælland & AaB
In 2015, Raitala played in Denmark. He signed a half year contract with FC Vestsjælland on a free transfer. The club ended below the relegation zone, but the Danish media wrote that Raitala had been one of the best players in the club's weakly half year.

In the Summer of 2015, Raitala signed for one more half year with AaB. Raitala began very well, and played the first three matches and created one assist. But later was it clear that the competition on the left back-position was too strong. On 30 November 2015, announced the sports director Allan Gaarde, that Raitala had to find a new club.

On 3 December 2015 it was announced, that Raitala would leave the club at the end of the season with his contract expiring.

MLS career
On 23 December 2016, Raitala started his journey in Major League Soccer after Columbus Crew SC acquired him through a Discovery Signing for the 2017 season.

After one season with Columbus, on 12 December 2017, Raitala was selected by Los Angeles FC in the 2017 MLS Expansion Draft. He was then immediately traded with fellow expansion draftee Raheem Edwards to Montreal Impact in exchange for defender Laurent Ciman. Raitala's contract with Montreal expired at the conclusion of the 2020 season.

On 28 January 2021, Raitala's MLS rights were traded to Minnesota United and the club subsequently signed Raitala to a new contract.

Return to HJK
On 21 December 2021, it was announced that Raitala had returned to his first professional club HJK.

International career

When Raitala was 20 years old he made his Finnish national team debut on 4 February 2009, in Tokyo in a friendly match against Japan when Stuart Baxter used him as a substitute. He played his first UEFA European Championship qualification game on 3 June 2011 when Mixu Paatelainen chose him to the starting line up against San Marino in Serravalle. During summer 2011 he established himself as a regular in the Finland national team.

He was also a regular in the Finnish under-21 team that qualified for the UEFA European Under-21 Football Championship final tournament in 2009.

Honours

Club
HJK Helsinki
Finnish Cup: 2008
Veikkausliiga: 2009

Montreal Impact
 Canadian Championship: 2019

Individual
2009: Finland U21 Player of the Year

Career statistics

Club

International

References

External links
 
 
 
 
 
 
 
 Voetbal International profile 
 Profile at FA of Finland's official website 
 

1988 births
Living people
People from Kerava
Association football fullbacks
Finnish footballers
Finland youth international footballers
Finland under-21 international footballers
Finland international footballers
Helsingin Jalkapalloklubi players
Klubi 04 players
TSG 1899 Hoffenheim players
TSG 1899 Hoffenheim II players
SC Paderborn 07 players
CA Osasuna players
SC Heerenveen players
FC Vestsjælland players
AaB Fodbold players
Sogndal Fotball players
Columbus Crew players
CF Montréal players
Minnesota United FC players
Veikkausliiga players
Ykkönen players
Bundesliga players
2. Bundesliga players
Regionalliga players
La Liga players
Eredivisie players
Danish Superliga players
Eliteserien players
Major League Soccer players
UEFA Euro 2020 players
Finnish expatriate footballers
Expatriate footballers in Germany
Expatriate footballers in Spain
Expatriate footballers in the Netherlands
Expatriate men's footballers in Denmark
Expatriate footballers in Norway
Expatriate soccer players in the United States
Expatriate soccer players in Canada
Finnish expatriate sportspeople in Germany
Finnish expatriate sportspeople in Spain
Finnish expatriate sportspeople in the Netherlands
Finnish expatriate sportspeople in Denmark
Finnish expatriate sportspeople in Norway
Finnish expatriate sportspeople in the United States
Finnish expatriate sportspeople in Canada
Sportspeople from Uusimaa